, formerly , is the fourth daughter of Emperor Shōwa and Empress Kōjun. As such, she is the older sister of Emperor Emeritus Akihito. She married Takamasa Ikeda on 10 October 1952. As a result, she gave up her imperial title and left the Japanese Imperial Family, as required by law. Later, she served as the most sacred priestess (saishu) of the Ise Grand Shrine between 1988 and 2017.

Biography
Princess Atsuko was born at the Tokyo Imperial Palace on 7 March 1931, her father is the Emperor Showa (Hirohito), her mother is the Empress Kojun. She had three elder sisters, the Princess Shigeko Teru-no-miya, the Princess Sachiko Hisa-no-miya (died as a baby) and the Princess Kazuko Taka-no-miya.

As with her elder two sisters, she was not raised by her biological parents, but by a succession of court ladies at a separate palace built for her and her elder sisters in the Marunouchi district of Tokyo. She graduated from the Gakushūin Peer's School, and was also tutored along with her siblings in English language by an American tutor, Elizabeth Gray Vining during the American occupation of Japan following World War II. She graduated from Gakushuin University Women's College in March 1952.

On 10 October 1952, Princess Yori married , the eldest son of former Marquis Nobumasa Ikeda and a direct descendant of the last daimyō of Okayama Domain, whom she had met at a Japanese tea ceremony at Kōraku-en gardens. The couple were engaged after only six months, but wedding plans had to be postponed due to the death of her grandmother Empress Teimei in 1951 and subsequent period of mourning. Upon her marriage, Princess Yori became the second daughter of an emperor to relinquish her status as a member of the Japanese imperial family and become a commoner upon marriage, in accordance with the 1947 Imperial Household Law. The groom's father and the bride's mother, the Empress, were first cousins, making the couple second cousins.

The former princess relocated to Okayama Prefecture, where her husband, a wealthy cattle rancher, served as director of the Ikeda Zoo outside of Okayama city for over fifty years.

In 1965, she was hospitalized with sepsis, which was a cause of great concern for the Imperial Family, as her elder sister Shigeko Higashikuni had already died of stomach cancer.

In October 1988, Ikeda succeeded her ailing elder sister, Kazuko Takatsukasa, as the most sacred priestess (saishu) of the Ise Shrine. She served in that capacity until 19 June 2017, whereupon she was succeeded by her niece, Sayako Kuroda. She also served as the Chairperson of the Association of Shinto Shrines until June 2017.

The Ikedas had no children.

Titles and styles

 7 March 1931 – 10 October 1952: Her Imperial Highness Princess Yori
 10 October 1952 – present: Mrs. Takamasa Ikeda

Honours

National honours
 Grand Cordon of the Order of the Precious Crown

Ancestry

Gallery

Sources

 Foreign Affairs Association of Japan, The Japan Year Book  (Tokyo: Kenkyusha Press, 1939–40, 1941–42, 1944–45, 1945–46, 1947–48).
 Takie Sugiyama Lebra, Above the Clouds: Status Culture of the Modern Japanese Nobility (Berkeley: University of California Press, 1992).
 "Hirohito's Daughter Wed: Princess Yori Married to Tokyo Commoner by Shinto Rites," New York Times 10 October 1952.

References

1931 births
Living people
People from Tokyo
Japanese princesses
Ikeda clan
Kannushi

Grand Cordons (Imperial Family) of the Order of the Precious Crown